The Sofia Open is a defunct Grand Prix affiliated men's tennis tournament played from 1980 to 1981. It was held in Sofia in Bulgaria and played on indoor carpet courts.

Results

Singles

Doubles

See also
 Vitosha New Otani Open – women's tournament (1988–1989)

External links
 ATP results archive

Carpet court tennis tournaments
Tennis tournaments in Bulgaria
Grand Prix tennis circuit
Defunct tennis tournaments in Europe
Defunct sports competitions in Bulgaria